Dinaric may refer to:

 Dinara, a mountain on the border of Croatia with Bosnia and Herzegovina
 Dinaric Alps, a mountain chain
 Dinaric race, in physical anthropology